Guus Zeegers (25 January 1906 – 26 February 1978) was a Dutch middle-distance runner. He competed in the men's 800 metres at the 1928 Summer Olympics. He was a younger brother of middle-distance runner Jan Zeegers.

References

External links
 

1906 births
1978 deaths
Athletes (track and field) at the 1928 Summer Olympics
Dutch male middle-distance runners
Olympic athletes of the Netherlands
Athletes from Amsterdam